Dmitry Tursunov was the defending champion, but second-seeded Gilles Simon defeated him 6–4, 6–4, in the final.

Seeds

Draw

Finals

Top half

Bottom half

External links
 Draw
 Qualifying draw

Singles